Libellulosoma is a genus of dragonfly in family Corduliidae. It contains the following species:
 Libellulosoma minuta

Corduliidae
Taxonomy articles created by Polbot